The Qatar Women's Football League is the main women's football tournament in Qatar. It currently features six teams, and is played as one round-robin with the top team after all matches winning the league.

History 
The Qatar Women's Football League was first organized by the Qatar Women's Sports Committee and Qatar Football Association to promote and improve women's football in the country.

Teams
Al Sadd
Al-Khor
Al-Gharafa
Qatar
Al-Ahli
Al-Rayyan

Results

By season

See also
 Qatar women's national football team

References

External links 
 Qatar Football Association

Top level women's association football leagues in Asia
Women